Odostomia takapunaensis is a species of sea snail, a marine gastropod mollusk in the family Pyramidellidae, the pyrams and their allies.

References

takapunaensis
Gastropods described in 1908